Müzdat Yetkiner (1922 – 23 November 1994) was a Turkish footballer. He played in eight matches for the Turkey national football team from 1950 to 1954. He was also part of Turkey's team for their qualification matches for the 1954 FIFA World Cup.

References

External links
 

1922 births
1994 deaths
Turkish footballers
Turkey international footballers
Place of birth missing
Association footballers not categorized by position